Stalin's bunker may refer to:
 Stalin's bunker, Samara
 Informal name for Tagansky Protected Command Point, Moscow
 A bunker under Stalin's Kuntsevo Dacha